Frederick Winston Furneaux Smith, 2nd Earl of Birkenhead (7 December 1907 – 10 June 1975) was a British biographer and Member of the House of Lords. He is best known for writing a biography of Rudyard Kipling that was suppressed by the Kipling family for many years, and which he never lived to see in print.

Biography
The son of F. E. Smith, 1st Earl of Birkenhead, he was known as Viscount Furneaux from 1922, when his father, then 1st Viscount Birkenhead, was created Earl of Birkenhead. He had two sisters, Eleanor (1902–1945) and Pamela (1914–1982). Lord Furneaux was educated at Eton and Christ Church, Oxford. He inherited his father's peerages in 1930.

In 1935, he married The Hon Sheila Berry (1913–1992), second daughter of the 1st Viscount Camrose. The couple had a son, Frederick William Robin Smith, 3rd Earl of Birkenhead, in 1936 and a daughter, Lady Juliet Margaret Smith (later Lady Juliet Townsend), in 1941. Lady Juliet served as Lady in Waiting to Princess Margaret from 1965 to 2002; her daughter Eleanor Townsend is a god-child of the Princess. Lady Juliet was made a Dame Commander of the Royal Victorian Order (DCVO) in the 2014 Birthday Honours having previously received the LVO in 1981 and was Lord Lieutenant of Northamptonshire from 1998 to 2014. She died on 29 November 2014.

For the first three years of the Second World War, Lord Birkenhead served with a Territorial Army Anti-Tank unit.  Following a course at the Staff College, Camberley, Major "Freddy" Birkenhead was assigned to the Foreign Office's Political Intelligence Department, popularly known as the Political Warfare Executive, or PWE for short.  He saw action in Croatia, as second-in-command of a sub-mission headed by Randolph Churchill, under Brigadier Fitzroy Maclean's 37th Military Mission, which included Evelyn Waugh. As a result, he plays a prominent role in Waugh's diaries.

Lord Birkenhead served as Parliamentary Private Secretary to Lord Halifax (1938–1939), and as Lord-in-waiting to King George VI (1938–1940 and 1951–1952) and Queen Elizabeth II (1952–1955).

As a writer, Lord Birkenhead primarily authored political biographies, including books on Lord Cherwell and Lord Halifax. In the late 1940s, Lord Birkenhead was commissioned by Rudyard Kipling's daughter Elsie Bambridge to write a biography of Kipling. An agreement with Lord Birkenhead gave Bambridge control over the contents, ownership of copyright, and two-thirds of any profits. Ultimately, Bambridge did not accept Lord Birkenhead's work, and it remained unpublished through his death in 1975 and her death in 1976. The biography was finally published in 1978 with the agreement of Bambridge's heirs.

Lord Birkenhead died in June 1975 at age 67. At the time of his death, he was working on a biography of Winston Churchill (who was his godfather); the completed portion, covering Churchill's life until 1922, was published in 1989.

Books
 F.E.: The Life of F.E. Smith, first Earl of Birkenhead (London, Eyre and Spottiswoode, 1960).

 Frederick Edwin Earl of Birkenhead (1933 and 1936)
 Strafford (Hutchinson & Co. Ltd, 1938) 
 Lady Eleanor Smith: a memoir (1953) 
 Life of Lord Halifax (1965) 
 The life of Viscount Monckton of Brenchley (1969) 
 Rudyard Kipling (1978) 
 Churchill, 1874–1922 (1989)

Arms

References

1907 births
1975 deaths
Alumni of Christ Church, Oxford
People educated at Eton College
Conservative Party (UK) Baronesses- and Lords-in-Waiting
Earls in the Peerage of the United Kingdom
Ministers in the Chamberlain peacetime government, 1937–1939
Ministers in the Chamberlain wartime government, 1939–1940
Ministers in the third Churchill government, 1951–1955
Queen's Own Oxfordshire Hussars officers
British Army personnel of World War II
20th-century English male writers